Danny McCarthy is an American actor best known as Agent Danny Hale on Prison Break (2005–06).

Career
He has acted in plays with the Steppenwolf Theatre Company and the Famous Door, and has performed twice at the Edinburgh Festival in Scotland. Other credits include The Amityville Horror, Early Edition, What About Joan, and Alleyball. McCarthy is an ensemble member at A Red Orchid Theatre in Chicago. McCarthy created, together with Alleyball writer/director Dan Consiglio, SOXTALK with Pat and Tony, a series of four 30-minute shows that aired on Comcast Sports Net Chicago. McCarthy starred as "Pat", a longtime know-it-all White Sox supporter.

External links
 Danny McCarthy Official Actor Website
PerformInk Online, Stage Persona

Danny McCarthy biography at A Red Orchid Theatre, Chicago
Danny as "Pat" in SOXTALK with Pat and Tony

Male actors from Chicago
American male film actors
American male television actors
Webster University alumni
Living people
Year of birth missing (living people)